Hemileuca oliviae, the range caterpillar, is a species of insect in the moth family Saturniidae. It is found in Central America and North America.

The MONA or Hodges number for Hemileuca oliviae is 7729.

References

Further reading

 
 
 

Hemileucinae
Articles created by Qbugbot
Moths described in 1898